Joe Ma Wai-ho is a Hong Kong film director, scriptwriter and producer.

Filmography as director

 On Fallen Wings (2017)
 Days of Our Own (2016)
 The Lion Roars 2 (2012)
 Stand by Me (2011)
 My Sassy Girl 2 (2010)
 Sasori (2008)
 Love Undercover 3 (2006)
 Embrace Your Shadow (2005)
 Hidden Heroes (2004)
 Three of a Kind (2004)
 Sound of Colors (2003)
 Love Undercover 2: Love Mission (2003)
 Feel 100% 2003 (2003)
 Next Station... Tin Hau (2003)
 Summer Breeze of Love (2002)
 Love Undercover (2002)
 The Lion Roars (2002)
 Dummy Mommy, Without a Baby (2001)
 Funeral March (2001)
 Fighting for Love (2001)
 Feel 100% II (2001)
 Afraid of Nothing: The Jobless King (1999)
 Lawyer Lawyer (1997)
 First Love Unlimited (1997)
 He Comes from Planet K (1997)
 Feel 100%... Once More (1996)
 Feel 100% (1996)
 Till Death Do Us Laugh (1996)
 The Golden Girls (1995)
 Over the Rainbow, Under the Skirt (1994)
 Rich Man (1992)

References

External links
 
 HK Cinemagic: Transcript of an interview with Joe Ma and Miriam Yeung, April 2002

Hong Kong film directors
1964 births
Living people